Wildfire is a superhero appearing in DC Comics, primarily as a member of the Legion of Super-Heroes in the 30th and 31st centuries. Created by Cary Bates and Dave Cockrum, the character debuted in Superboy #195 (June 1973).

Publication history
Cockrum originally wanted to name the character Starfire, but was told that he couldn't, because there were already plans to introduce a character named Starfire in the Teen Titans.

Wildfire was immediately popular with readers. At that time, the editors of Superboy and the Legion of Super-Heroes held periodic elections in which readers could choose the Legion's leader. Soon after his introduction, Wildfire was elected to that post. In-story, Wildfire actually lost the election to Superboy, but as no candidate had received a majority of the votes, the membership decided that the Legion needed a member who was available full-time rather than the time travelling, part-time Kryptonian member.

Fictional character biography

Original

Wildfire was originally Drake Burroughs, an astroengineer. While he was working on a new propulsion system, the unit's safety valve snapped and discharged a blast of anti-matter energy. Burroughs was engulfed, and his body disintegrated instantly. However, his consciousness somehow survived, and he was transformed into a being of pure anti-energy. His colleagues had on hand a "containment suit" that could be used to keep Drake's anti-energy from dispersing. Once confined to a specific area, Drake's energy form stabilized and became self-regenerating. He again possessed a semblance of humanoid form, but he had no true human form and lacked most human sensory functions, such as taste or touch.

Drake's new form has vast super-powers, the most potent of which is the power to fire energy blasts. He was originally reluctant to use the ability due to an accident in which he nearly killed his former girlfriend. Calling himself ERG-1 (Energy Release Generator 1), Drake decides to petition for membership in the Legion. To his surprise, he is turned down because the abilities he demonstrated simply duplicate those of other members such as Mon-El, Colossal Boy, and Chemical King; at that time, Legion's by-laws required that each member possess at least one superpower no other active member had. Drake had not demonstrated his energy-blasting or manipulation abilities because he was concerned he could not control them safely. Still, anxious to prove his abilities, he followed several Legionnaires on a mission to the planet Manna-5, during which Colossal Boy is knocked unconscious by an enemy machine, and none of the other Legionnaires present have the power to save him. ERG-1 destroys the machine, but he expels all his energy from his containment suit. Because his energy form is invisible, the Legionnaires assumed he was dead, but he was not.

His energy form was stable enough so that he could survive without his suit, though he can neither take humanoid form nor communicate with anyone. He followed the Legionnaires back to Earth where they put his containment suit on display. Upon reaching the Legionnaires' headquarters, he manages to regain the suit and save the Legion from another menace. He was then admitted to the team and adopted the name Wildfire.

Over time, Wildfire loses many of his powers. This is partly because of the trauma of the explosive exit from his containment suit. In addition, his original containment suit is eventually destroyed, and subsequent copies were not as versatile. His later suits are also not nearly as durable, and it is easier to cause him to be expelled from it. Even so, he always retains his powers of flight, energy absorption, energy projection, and super strength. He is commonly considered among the four most powerful Legionnaires along with Superboy, Mon-El and Ultra Boy.

Initially, Wildfire and Superboy are rivals and fight over the position of team leader. Wildfire acquits himself well in that battle, establishing that his raw power is comparable to a Kryptonian's. As leader, Wildfire receives mixed reviews. Though he is decisive and a gifted tactician, his poor people skills alienate many of his fellow members (though not, ironically, Superboy; at the conclusion of a particularly rough crisis, he tells his one-time rival that he had become "one hell of a Legionnaire"). He leads the Legion through the Earthwar and Omega crises but is defeated for re-election by Lightning Lad.

Shortly after becoming leader, Wildfire recruits a young Amerindian mutant, Dawnstar. He soon becomes enamored of her, but for years theirs is a love-hate relationship. It is clear to their teammates that they are extremely fond of each other, if not actively in love, but Dawnstar will not admit her feelings. Wildfire, in return, is often passive-aggressive in his treatment of her. It is eventually revealed that Dawnstar does reciprocate his feelings, but she fears that she will never know physical love since Wildfire does not possess a physical body.

Some time later, the Legion admits an extra-dimensional being, Quislet. Like Wildfire, Quislet is an entity of pure energy and requires a containment device to survive on Earth. Unlike Wildfire, though, Quislet's condition is natural to his species. He teaches Wildfire how to control his energy form without needing the containment suit. In this new form, Wildfire is much closer to human, being visible, tangible, and possessing facial features, but his body is still so hot that his mere touch burns Dawnstar. The two star-crossed lovers attempt to consummate their passion, but Wildfire cannot bear to cause her pain (though she is willing to attempt to bear it). He may have attained greater control of his temperature given further lessons with Quislet, but before he can do so, Quislet's own containment device is destroyed and he is forced to return to his own dimension. Quislet has been surreptitiously assisting Wildfire to maintain physical form, and after he leaves, Wildfire quickly loses the ability to maintain his form. He resumes use of the containment suit and remains in that form for some time; eventually, in post-Crisis continuity, he uses his powers to reignite Earth's sun, and his consciousness ends up in Sun Boy's corpse, a condition he maintains until the Legion reboot.

Post-Zero Hour

Following Zero Hour, Wildfire was absent from Legion comics for some years, and when he returned, it was with a drastically different origin.

In a fight with Mordru, Atom'X (Randall Burroughs) and Blast-Off (Jahr-Drake Ningle), members of the Uncanny Amazers and Workforce respectively, were seemingly killed by the villain. Some time later, several Legionnaires noticed energy patterns in the area, and Umbra was able to contain the energy long enough for them to realize that it was sentient. When they retrieved it to a laboratory, they found it contained the inseparable minds of both Atom'X and Blast-Off. Although Umbra in particular was disgusted by the forced integration, they successfully contained the energy long enough to create a containment suit for it, and the new being took the name Drake Burroughs after his forebears and the codename ERG-1.

Shortly afterward, ERG-1 was one of the Legionnaires lost in a spatial rift — although he suffered a traumatic experience as his containment suit was ripped open by the rift.

When Element Lad returned the other Legionnaires to normal space, albeit becoming separated from them in time in the process, ERG-1's energy leeched into space, congealing as a "star" noticed by Shikari's nomadic people, the Kwai, which led her to discover and accidentally revive the other Legionnaires, who had been held in suspended animation. Soon afterward, while the Legionnaires met the Kwai, Kid Quantum noticed that the "feral star" the Kwai had been following was in fact ERG-1. Brainiac 5, with the Kwai's help and materials, managed to create a new containment suit for him, restoring a semblance of form to him. In addition, the time spent alone in space had merged his two minds into one. Shortly afterward, he took the name Wildfire after a mistranslation by Shikari.

Some time after they returned to their home galaxy, however, he was captured by Qward and used to power their whole planet for a considerable period. Though his power was great, it was finite, and after his rescue, he was left so weakened by the experience that the threat of running out of energy became a real and ongoing threat to him.

"Threeboot"
Drake was eventually introduced into the "Threeboot" continuity in the "Quest for Cosmic Boy" storyline. This version of Drake has the same abilities as the previous versions, and his containment suit is identical to the one he used in pre-Zero Hour continuity. This version of E.R.G.-1 was believed to have been destroyed when his containment suit ruptured during his try-out mission, but his energy was collected and reconstituted by his brother Randall. This E.R.G.-1 was manipulated by his brother to become an assassin, but that was eventually stopped by Brainiac 5 and Atom Girl. He was later seen fighting the creatures from the Intruder Planet.

One year later
A version of Drake resembling his original incarnation appears in "The Lightning Saga" crossover in Justice Society of America (vol. 3) and Justice League of America (vol. 2), unwillingly masquerading as a statue in the Fortress of Solitude. He reveals that his containment suit is actually the Red Tornado's robotic shell and indicates that he has at least some of the Red Tornado's memories.

By the end of Final Crisis: Legion of 3 Worlds, this version of Drake has finally entered into a relationship with Dawnstar.

The New 52
In The New 52, Wildfire, along with Dawnstar, Chameleon Girl, Tellus, Tyroc, Gates, and Timber Wolf are all stranded in the 21st century after apprehending a time-travelling terrorist. This new series, also titled Legion Lost ran for 16 issues and dealt with the characters' feelings of being trapped in a (to them) primitive society and having to fit in while not changing their future. In this version Wildfire wore a more armor-like suit of red & black instead of the original orange and red.

In the Future's End: 5 Years Later event, he is revealed to have joined, and left, the Justice League.

In the "Watchmen" sequel "Doomsday Clock", Wildfire is among the Legion of Super-Heroes members that appear in the present after Doctor Manhattan undid the experiment that erased the Legion of Super-Heroes and the Justice Society of America.

Powers and abilities
 Unique physiology: A being of pure anti-matter energy, Wildfire possessed a variety of superhuman abilities. Wildfire no longer has a physical body, however his essence must be contained within a specially designed suit.
 Superhuman strength: Wildfire possessed a strength level many times greater than that of the average human.
 Energy projection: Wildfire could produce concentrated blasts of pure energy for offensive attack.
 Energy absorption: As such, he could also absorb large amounts of energy, without any undue stress to his form.
 Flight: Wildfire could travel at faster than light speeds without the aid of external applications.
 Invulnerability: Although Wildfire's containment suit can be destroyed, his energy body is virtually invulnerable and can only be dispersed under the most extreme of conditions.
 X-Ray vision: Like his teammate, Superboy, Wildfire possessed the ability to see through varying layers of solid objects.
 Energy construct creation: Another application of Wildfire's energy projection, was the ability to generate simple hard-light constructs. The properties of this ability are similar to that produced by a Green Lantern Ring, but Wildfire can only create simple geometric constructs.
 Size alteration: Wildfire could expand his mass and volume several times greater than normal, allowing him to achieve heights similar to that of Colossal Boy. In contrast, he could compact the density of his molecular structure to assume a miniaturized form, similar to that of teammate Shrinking Violet.

Equipment
As a member of the Legion of Super-Heroes, he is provided a Legion Flight Ring. It allows him to fly and protects him from the vacuum of space and other dangerous environments.

Other versions
 A version of Drake appeared in Legion of Super-Heroes Annual #7, under the Legends of the Dead Earth banner. This Drake claims to be the last living Legionnaire from the long dead planet Earth, his energy powers having rendered him immortal. Drake's origin is much the same as his original counterpart. While the book implied that this was the future of the post-Zero Hour Legion, Drake's backstory conflicts too greatly with that of the version of Wildfire that was introduced in later in the series, along with certain elements that never occurred in the main series, such as the introduction of Quislet and Reflecto, and a new character called Galaxy Girl, into the Legion. This Drake has led various teams of Legionnaires in battle against a group of terrorists who have been blowing up stars and planets to keep the rest of the universe separated from one another, but the members he recruits continue to die on their missions because of their prejudices. The only three surviving members who still aid him are Rimborians, Gizi and Ziga, and an alien named Membrain. Drake, up until that point, suffered some memory loss, and by undergoing sensory deprivation and having them restored, he decided to recruit teenagers. This is a successful move, as his new team is able to stop the terrorist group, revealed to be Durlans, from destroying any more stars and move on to help reunite the universe as the United Planets.
 A version of Drake called Erg plays a Tin Woodsman-esque role in Legion of Super-Heroes Annual #5, The Long Road Home. The story was released under the Elseworlds banner.
 An ancestor of Dawnstar, known as Wildstar is a member of the 21st century hero team R.E.B.E.L.S. She has the combined powers of Dawnstar and Wildfire.

In other media
Wildfire makes a cameo appearance in the Justice League Unlimited episode "Far From Home", among the Legionnaires mind-controlled by the Fatal Five.

Wildfire makes a non-speaking appearance in the Legion of Super-Heroes episode "Dark Victory", fighting Imperiex's forces. According to producer James Tucker, he would have replaced Kell-El as a member of the Legion in the cancelled third season.

References

Comics characters introduced in 1973
DC Comics aliens
DC Comics metahumans
DC Comics characters with superhuman strength
DC Comics extraterrestrial superheroes
DC Comics superheroes
Characters created by Dave Cockrum